Linda Williams (born December 18, 1946) is an American professor of film studies in the departments of Film Studies and Rhetoric at University of California, Berkeley.

Career
Williams graduated from University of California, Berkeley with a B.A in Comparative Literature in 1969, and then earned a PhD at the University of Colorado for her dissertation subsequently published as Figures of Desire: A Theory and Analysis of Surrealist Film. Her main academic areas of interest are: film history, film genre, melodrama, pornography, feminist theory and visual culture; all with an emphasis on women, gender, race, and sexuality.

With respect to film genres, she argues that horror, melodrama, and pornography all fall into the category of "body genres", since they are each designed to elicit physical reactions on the part of viewers. Horror is designed to elicit spine-chilling, white-knuckled, eye-bulging terror (often through images of blood); melodramas are designed to elicit sympathy (often through images of tears); and pornography is designed to elicit sexual arousal (often through images of "money shots").  Williams believes that much pornographic expression, and the form that expression takes, is due to the distance between the audience and the actual performers, and so, she concludes, much of what pornography becomes is a type of compensation for the distance between viewer and viewed.

Professional experience
Assistant Professor of English, University of Illinois, Chicago. 1977-83
Associate Professor of English, University of Illinois, Chicago. 1984-89
Professor, Film Studies, University of California, Irvine. 1989-97
Acting Director, Winter 1993
Director, Summer 1994 and Spring 1996
Professor of Film Studies and Rhetoric, University of California, Berkeley. 1997–Present
Director of Program in Film Studies, July 1999-Present

Selected honors and awards
1989 Katherine Singer Kovács Prize in Film, TV, and Video Studies for essay Fetishism and the Visual Pleasure of Hard Core: Marx, Freud and the 'Money Shot'''; and finalist for the best book in Cinema Studies: both the Jay Leyda Prize and the Kovacks Prize (for Hard Core)
2004 Distinguished Teaching Award, UC Berkeley 
2004-2005 Humanities Research Fellowship, UC Berkeley
2011 Faculties Research Lecture, UC Berkeley 
2012 Katherine Singer Kovács Prize for "'Cluster Fuck': The Forcible Frame in Errol Morris' Standard Operating Procedure."  
2013 Society for Cinema and Media Studies Career Achievement Award 
Class of 1940, Second Chair: UC Berkeley.

Writings

AuthorFigures of Desire: A Theory and Analysis of Surrealist Film, University of Illinois Press, 1981. Paperback edition: University of California Press, 1992, Hard Core: Power, Pleasure and the Frenzy of the Visible (University of California Press, 1989). Expanded Paperback Edition: University of California Press, 1999, Playing the Race Card: Melodramas of Black & White from Uncle Tom to O.J.Simpson, Princeton University Press, Paperback edition, 2002, Screening Sex, Duke University Press, 2008, On The Wire, Duke University Press, 2014, 

EditorRevision: Essays in Feminist Film Criticism. Coedited with Mary Anne Doane and Patricia Mellencamp, American Film Institute Monograph Series Frederick Maryland: University Publications of America, 1984.  Viewing Positions: Ways of Seeing Film. Edited. New Brunswick: Rutgers University Press, 1994. Reinventing Film Studies. Co-edited anthology with Christine Gledhill. London: Edward Arnold. New York: Oxford University Press, 2000. Porn Studies. Durham: Duke University Press, 2004. 

Journal articles
 Williams, Linda. "Film Bodies: Gender, Genre, and Excess." Film Quarterly'' 44, no. 4 (1991): 2-13. doi:10.2307/1212758.

References

External links
 Linda Williams's faculty page
 Linda Williams Papers - Pembroke Center Archives, Brown University

1946 births
University of California, Berkeley faculty
Living people
Place of birth missing (living people)
Writers from the San Francisco Bay Area
American film critics
American women film critics
American film historians
American women historians
Historians from California
21st-century American women